St. Bernard Preparatory School is a private, Roman Catholic day school and boarding school in Cullman, Alabama.  It is run independently of the Roman Catholic Diocese of Birmingham in Alabama by the Benedictine monks of St. Bernard Abbey, located on the same campus.

History
Colonel John G. Cullmann, a German immigrant founded the town of Cullman in 1873. He promoted the town among other German immigrants. Benedictine Monks came to the city from Saint Vincent Archabbey in Latrobe, Pennsylvania in the 1880s. A number of these monks had come from Bavaria, in order to serve this German-speaking Catholic community.  They established St. Bernard Abbey on September 29, 1891, named after St. Bernard of Clairvaux.

In 1891, they also started St. Bernard College on the monastery grounds, educating boys from grades 6-12. The state chartered the school in 1893. While primarily a prep school, it sometimes granted bachelor's degrees.

In 1929 the Board of Trustees added a junior college. In 1949, this became a senior college. In time, the college discontinued the preparatory school and in 1976 merged with a local women's college to become Southern Benedictine College.

Over the years, the school and abbey has also educated candidates for ordination through its seminary programs from high school through graduate studies.

Southern Benedictine College was closed in 1979, however, the institution reopened in 1984 as a coeducational college preparatory school, serving grades 9-12 (these grades became the Upper School in 2007). The Upper School is primarily housed in the Cullman-Swisher School Building, which was refurbished in 2009.  Grades 7 and 8, the Middle School, were added in 2007. The Middle School is located in Founders' Hall.

Athletics
As a member of the Alabama High School Athletic Association, the school competes with public and private schools in football, cross country, basketball, volleyball, soccer, baseball, softball, and tennis.

Boys' sports:
 Baseball
 Wrestling

Girls' sports:
 Cheerleading
 Volleyball

Co-ed sports:
 Basketball
 Cross Country
 Soccer
 Tennis
Bowling

Soccer games at the school are played at one of the school's newest facilities, Alumni Field, which is located in the athletics area of the school campus.

Basketball, volleyball and wrestling games and matches are played in the central facility of the St. Bernard Prep athletics area, the Fazi-Richard Athletic Center. The facility, completed in the mid-1990s, is complete with locker rooms, weight and training rooms, coaches' offices, a state-of-the-art basketball/volleyball court, and conference room.  The Fazi-Richard Athletic Center is a multi-purpose facility as it hosts numerous performing arts, scholastic and alumni events yearly for the school, in addition to the athletic events.

Tennis matches are played at the school's tennis grounds, Blevins Courts, which were renovated and subsequently renamed in late 2008, in honor of the alumni donor who funded the project. Blevins Courts are located adjacent to the Fazi-Richard Athletic Center and the project consisted of the renovation of three existing courts and the conversion of three additional courts from clay-surface to hard-surface courts. Also included in the project was the replacement of the deteriorated fence around the clay courts and the restoration of the fencing around the existing courts.

References

External links
 School Website
 St. Bernard Abbey Website
 The Association of Boarding Schools profile

Catholic secondary schools in Alabama
Schools in Cullman County, Alabama
Educational institutions established in 1891
Private middle schools in Alabama
1891 establishments in Alabama
Boarding schools in Alabama
Catholic boarding schools in the United States